Endotricha rogenhoferi is a species of snout moth in the genus Endotricha. It was described by Hans Rebel in 1892, and is known from the Canary Islands.

References

Moths described in 1892
Endotrichini